Assara linjiangensis is a species of snout moth in the genus Assara. It was described by Yan-Li Du, Hou-Hun Li and Shu-Xia Wang in 2002 and is known from China.

References

Moths described in 2002
Phycitini
Moths of Asia